Wayward Lad (1975-2003) was a successful English Thoroughbred National Hunt racehorse. He was one of the "Dickinson five" (Michael Dickinson-trained horses that took the first five places at the 1983 Cheltenham Gold Cup). The horse's career ended in spring 1987 with a second success in the Whitbread Gold Label Chase at Aintree. By then he had won 28 of his 55 races on 16 different tracks. That final success, at the 1987 Grand National meeting, brought his career earnings to £218,732, at the time a sum beaten only by Dawn Run. His most prestigious wins came in the King George VI Chase, which he won for a third time in 1985. A row between his owners resulted in the horse going to the Doncaster sales, where Tony Dickinson (Michael's father) bought him for 42,000 Guineas. He was then sent into retirement with his son, who had begun a new career training in the USA.

Races

References

 The Complete Encyclopedia of Horse Racing - written by Bill Mooney and George Ennor
 Wayward Lad's pedigree and racing stats

1975 racehorse births
2003 racehorse deaths
Racehorses trained in the United Kingdom
Racehorses bred in the United Kingdom
National Hunt racehorses
Thoroughbred family 2-b